Christopher Curry (born Christopher Root; October 22, 1948) is an American character actor of film and television who has appeared in more than 70 films and television programs since the 1980s. His best-known roles are as Captain Bosch in C.H.U.D. and Rico's father in Starship Troopers. He also had a small role in Red Dragon, and appeared as FBI Agent Stuckey in Home Alone 3. From 2011 until 2015, he portrayed the recurring role of Earl Kinsella, the father of Wade Kinsella in the CW TV series Hart of Dixie.

Filmography

References
 Christopher Curry at Aveleyman

External links
 

American male film actors
American male television actors
Living people
1948 births